James L. Harris was a college football player for the Sewanee Tigers football team. As of 1949, he was living in New Orleans. He played as a tackle and a running back. He was selected All-Southern in 1908.

References

American football running backs
American football tackles
Sewanee Tigers football players